is a Japanese rugby union player who plays as a wing. He currently plays for Suntory Sungoliath in Japan's domestic Top League. He represented the Sunwolves in the 2017 Super Rugby season.

References

1990 births
Living people
Japanese rugby union players
Rugby union wings
Sunwolves players
Tokyo Sungoliath players
21st-century Japanese people